Caspase recruitment domain-containing protein 10 is a protein in the CARD-CC protein family that in humans is encoded by the CARD10 gene.

Function 

The caspase recruitment domain (CARD) is a protein module that consists of 6 or 7 antiparallel alpha helices. It participates in signaling through highly specific protein-protein homophilic interactions. CARDs induce nuclear factor kappa-B (NF-κB; MIM 164011) activity through the IKK (e.g., IKBKB; MIM 603258) complex. CARD9 (MIM 607212), CARD10, CARD11 (MIM 607210), and CARD14 (MIM 607211) interact with BCL10 (MIM 603517) and are involved in NF-κB signaling complexes. Except for CARD9, these CARD proteins are members of the membrane-associated guanylate kinase (MAGUK) family.[supplied by OMIM]

Interactions 

CARD10 has been shown to interact with BCL10.

References

External links

Further reading